Melbourne Town Hall is the central city town hall of Melbourne, Victoria, Australia, and is a historic building in the state of Victoria since 1867. Located in the central business district on the northeast corner of the intersection between Swanston and Collins Street, it is the seat of the local municipality of the City of Melbourne, and has been used for multiple purposes such as concerts, theatrical plays and exhibitions.

History

Melbourne was officially incorporated as a town on 13 December 1842, with Henry Condell as its first Mayor. However, it wasn't until 1854 that its first Town Hall was completed. Begun in 1851, the work ground to a halt with the beginning of the Victorian gold rush. The foundation stone of a new, grander Town Hall was laid on 29 November 1867 by the visiting Prince Alfred, Duke of Edinburgh, after the demolition of the first. The current Town Hall officially opened on 11 August 1870 with a lavish ball, which was personally funded by the Lord Mayor Samuel Amess.

The foundation stone of the additional front portico was laid in 1887, and Sir Henry Weedon laid the foundation of the administrative annex building on 27 August 1908.

An early cinema event Soldiers of the Cross premiered at the Melbourne Town Hall on the 13th September 1900 to an audience of about four thousand people.

In 1925, a fire destroyed a large part of the town hall, including the main auditorium and pipe organ. It was rebuilt and enlarged, extending east over the site previously occupied by the Victoria Coffee Palace, an early temperance hotel frequented by Melbourne's power brokers. The rebuilt section lost some of Reed's original flourishes including the elaborate mansard roof.

In 1964, The Beatles attended a civic reception at the Melbourne Town Hall. "Outside 20,000 teenagers had gathered to obtain a glimpse of the pop idols. Again, frenzied and hysterical cheering and uncontrollable screaming erupted when the Beatles emerged."

Architecture

The Town Hall was designed by the famous local architect Joseph Reed and Barnes, in the Second Empire style. Reed's designs also included the State Library of Victoria, the Royal Exhibition Building, and Melbourne Trades Hall.

The building is topped by Prince Alfred's Tower, named after the Duke. The tower includes a 2.44 m diameter clock, which was started on 31 August 1874, after being presented to the council by the Mayor's son, Vallange Condell. It was built by Smith and Sons of London. The longest of its copper hands measures 1.19 m long, and weighs 8.85 kg.

Organ
The Main Auditorium includes a magnificent concert organ, now comprising 147 ranks and 9,568 pipes. The organ can be played by a fixed console located directly beneath the front pipes or by a secondary mobile console which is placed in close view of the audience for recitals. This organ is of great significance as it is the largest and most comprehensive pipe organ in Australia (measuring by number of voices/stops, the Sydney Opera House organ has more pipes thanks to its entirely "straight" design; there is no borrowing or duplexing at all whereas the Melbourne Town Hall organ makes extensive use of borrowing in the pedal division). The organ is best suited for romantic and symphonic works but is capable of playing just about anything thanks to its vast tonal resources.

History of the organ 

The organ was originally built by Hill & son (of England) in 1872 before a fire destroyed it in 1925. A new organ constructed by Hill Norman & Beard was installed in 1929 and has since then been rebuilt and enlarged by Schantz Organ Company of the United States of America from 1995 to 2001 at a cost of $4.5 million. The rebuild included 2 new floating divisions (Fanfare & Bombarde), many new voices and a secondary moveable console

Specification 
The stop list is as follows:

Tourism
 List of Town Halls in Melbourne
 List of Mayors and Lord Mayors of Melbourne

References 

 https://www.ohta.org.au/organs/organs/MTHHill.html
 https://whatson.melbourne.vic.gov.au/whatson/organ/pages/organ.aspx
 https://www.melbourne.vic.gov.au/SiteCollectionDocuments/grand-organ-specifications.pdf

External links

Town Hall History on the City of Melbourne official website
Town Hall in Melbourne

Theatres in Melbourne
Town halls in Melbourne
Buildings and structures in Melbourne City Centre
Government buildings completed in 1870
Heritage-listed buildings in Melbourne
1870 establishments in Australia
Neoclassical architecture in Australia
Second Empire architecture in Australia
Victorian architecture in Victoria (Australia)
Landmarks in Melbourne
Clock towers in Australia